Emmanuel Leducq-Barôme (born 1971) is a French conductor.

Life 
Leducq-Barôme received his education first in France (Conservatoire de Lyon, Conservatoire de Paris), then in Switzerland (Conservatoire de Musique de Genève) and in Russia (Saint Petersburg Conservatory), with Ilya Musin. He practiced at the Sibelius Academy in Helsinki and at the Amsterdam Conservatory.

In 1996 Leducq-Barôme began working with Russian orchestras in Novosibirsk, Irkutsk, Vladivostok, Ukraine, the Baltic States and France. He worked for three years as conductor of the Kaliningrad Philharmonic orchestra. He also performed as musical director of the Baltic Chamber Orchestra (the chamber department of the Saint Petersburg Philharmonic Orchestra and Moscow and the Russian State Orchestra. Since January 2006 he has been a permanently invited conductor of the St. Petersburg Opera House.

Leducq-Barôme has performed at many musical summer festivals in France, where he has worked with Pierre Amoyal, Arto Noras, Gérard Poulet, Régis Pasquier, André Cazalet, Nikolai Petrov and Denis Matsuev. In 2001 he was awarded the AFFA (Association Française d'Action Artistique) prize and the Lavoisierstipendium.

Since January 2008 he has been working with the Saint Petersburg Philharmonic Orchestra.

Discography 
 Discography (Discogs)
Krzysztof Penderecki: Concerto for clarinet (Soloist - Michel Lethiec, Sankt-Petersburger Philharmonisches Orchester), 2001
Dmitri Shostakovich: Piano Concerto No. 1 (soloist Yakov Kasman, Kaliningrads Orchester), 2002
Alfred Schnittke: Piano Concerto No. 1 (soloist Yakov Kasman, Kaliningrads Orchester), 2002
Arthur Honegger: Symphony No. 2 in D (Sankt-Petersburger Philharmonisches Orchester), 2003
Richard Strauss: Metamorphosen for 23 solo strings (Sankt-Petersburger Philharmonisches Orchester), 2003
Béla Bartók: Music for Strings, Percussion and Celesta, 2004
Wolfgang Amadeus Mozart: Symphonic Concerto for Violin and Viola (Soloists - Lew Klytschkow and Wladimir Stopitschew, Baltic Chamber Orchestra), 2005
Ludwig van Beethoven: Concerto for violin (soloist - Régis Pasquier, Baltic Chamber Orchestra), 2006

References

External links 
  Emmanuel Leducq-Barôme
 Mozart, Divertimento in D - Emmanuel Leducq-Barome / Baltic Chamber Orchestra (YouTube)

1971 births
Living people
Conservatoire de Paris alumni
People from Annecy
French male conductors (music)
21st-century French conductors (music)
21st-century French male musicians